Proszkow may refer to either of the following places in south-western Poland:
Prószków, a town in Opole Voivodeship
Proszków, a village in Lower Silesian Voivodeship